Afghanistan and Central Asian Association (ACAA) is a charitable incorporated organisation that supports London's refugee community and the Afghan diaspora in the United Kingdom. The organisation also campaigns for human rights, democracy and the fair treatment of refugees in Afghanistan and around the world. The charity has a dual mission of supporting the successful integration of refugees into Britain through grassroots service provision and of advocating for the promotion of human rights and fair treatment of refugees globally. The ACAA runs a variety of services, such as ESOL classes and a legal aid clinic, to help refugees integrate as well as hosting regular cultural events and international conferences to raise awareness of the plight of refugees. In 2018 the ACAA was awarded the Queens Award for Voluntary Service.

History

Launch 

The organisation was founded in 2001 by Nooralhaq Nasimi who arrived in the UK in 1999 in a refrigerated container with his wife and three young children, as a political refugee fleeing persecution at the hands of the Taliban. With the aid of local MPs and community organisations, Nasimi established the ACAA in 2001 in order to help other refugees, based on lessons he learnt from his own experiences attempting to integrate into the UK. The organisation was initially a community group that brought together Afghan refugees, but evolved to become a service provider that attempts to bridge gaps that exist for refugees who are attempting to build new lives in a new country.

The Organisation Today 

Today the charity runs ESOL classes, offers free legal clinics, runs a supplementary Saturday school for refugee children, offers a women's corner for female refugees and organises regular cultural and social events.  In 2017 the charity expanded significantly when it opened a second office in Hounslow, London. The charity now runs services across three London boroughs as well as in Afghanistan itself.

In June 2018 it worked with Lewisham Borough Council to assist recent refugee arrivals to access public services.

Work In Afghanistan

Citizens Advice Centres in Kabul and Pul-e-Khumri 

The ACAA launched Afghanistan's first two citizens advice centres in Kabul and Pul-e-Khumri in 2013 to provide free, impartial, and confidential legal advice to the local community. The centre in Kabul focuses on employment counselling and women's legal advice, whilst the centre in Pul-e-Khumri focuses on providing lessons in computer technology, English and with numerous other life skills.

References 

Foreign charities operating in Afghanistan
Afghan diaspora in Europe
Charities based in the United Kingdom
2001 establishments in the United Kingdom
Organizations established in 2001